Time and Again is a 1991 studio album by American jazz pianist Mulgrew Miller together with Peter Washington on bass and Tony Reedus on drums. This is his eighth album as a leader and sixth for Landmark Records label.

Reception

Scott Yanow of AllMusic wrote "Miller's ... recording finds him returning to the trio format with bassist Peter Washington and drummer Tony Reedus. Six of the ten selections are his compositions (including 'Tongue Twister,' 'Woeful Blues,' 'My Minuet' and an unaccompanied solo rendition of 'Song of Today'), while the four remaining songs include the spiritual "Lord, In the Morning Thou Shalt Hear" (taken solo) and Bud Powell's "I'll Keep Loving You." The reliable pianist is in typically fine form on this swinging and fairly exploratory set."

Billboard reviewers called the album "a tasteful program of originals and standards".

Track listing

Personnel
Mulgrew Miller – piano
Peter Washington – bass
Tony Reedus – drums

References

1991 albums
Landmark Records albums
Albums produced by Orrin Keepnews
Mulgrew Miller albums